Notonecta irrorata is a species of backswimmer native to North America first described by Philip Reese Uhler in 1879. Presence of N. irrorata in ponds is known to repel the oviposition of Culex mosquitoes.

References

Notonecta
Insects described in 1879
Hemiptera of North America
Taxa named by Philip Reese Uhler